This is a list of defunct airlines of Venezuela.

See also
List of airlines of Venezuela
List of airports in Venezuela

References

Venezuela
Airlines
Airlines, defunct